The 1970 Amstel Gold Race was the fifth edition of the annual road bicycle race "Amstel Gold Race", held on Sunday April 25, 1970, in the Dutch provinces of North Brabant and Limburg. The race stretched 240 kilometres, with the start in Helmond and the finish in Meerssen. There were a total of 125 competitors, and 41 cyclists finished the race.

Result

External links
Results

Amstel Gold Race
1970 in road cycling
1970 in Dutch sport